Jushu Station, formerly Fangcun Sports Center Station or Jucun Station during planning, is a metro station on the Guangfo Line (FMetro Line 1). It is located under the southwest of the Fangcun Sport Center in Fangcun, Liwan District, Guangzhou. It started operation on 3November 2010.

Station layout

Exits

References

Foshan Metro stations
Railway stations in China opened in 2010
Guangzhou Metro stations in Liwan District